Ahmad Saatchian (born October 3, 1972) is an Iranian theatre, television, and film actor, as well as a member of the barg group theater

Stage Credits
The Caucasian Chalk Circle 1997, by Bertolt Brecht, directed by Hamid Samandarian, Tehran.
No Exit 1998, by Jean-Paul Sartre, directed by Afsaneh Mahian, Tehran.
Crime and Punishment 1998, by Fyodor Dostoevsky, directed by Mikayil Shahrestani, Tehran.
Play Strindberg 1999, by Friedrich Dürrenmatt, directed by Hamid Samandarian, Tehran.
The Eight Voyage of Sindbad 2000, by Bahram Beyzayi, directed by Kyoumars Moradi, Tehran.
The Spell of the Burned Temple 2001, by Naghmeh Samini, directed by Kyoumars Moradi, Tehran and (India)
Rhinoceros 2001, by Eugène Ionesco, directed by Vahid Rahbani, Tehran.
Secrets and Lies 2002, by Naghmeh Samini, directed by Kyoumars Moradi, Tehran.
Dreaming in an empty cup 2003, by Naghmeh Samini, directed by Kyoumars Moradi, Tehran and 2005 (India)
Never snows in Egypt 2002, by Mohammad Charmshir, directed by Ali Rafie, Tehran.
Dead End 2004, by Pettre Torini, directed by Sohrab Salimi, Tehran.
Medea 2004, by Dario Fo, directed by Sohrab Salimi, Germany, Köln.
Grimace 2004, by Naghmeh Samini, directed by Kyoumars Moradi, Tehran.
The Professionals 2004 by Dostan Koyachovich, directed by Babak Mohammadi, Tehran.
Vanek Trilogie 2004 by Václav Havel, directed by Sohrab Salimi, Tehran.
Julius Caesar, Told by a Nightmare 2005, by Naghmeh Samini, directed by Kyoumars Moradi, Tehran.
Eleutheria, 2005, by Samuel Beckett, directed by Vahid Rahbani and Mohammad Reza Jozi, Tehran.

 Directing The Dumb Waiter by Harold Pinter for play reading, in 2003, Tehran.

Filmography
A Place to live, 2005, directed by Mohammad Bozorgnia.
Slowly, 2006, directed by Maziar Miri.
Don’t touch the orange curtain (Short film), 2005, directed by Yalda Jebelli.

Television series
The White Cottage, 2000, directed by Rahman Seyfi Azad, broadcast in IRIB.
Iced Heart, 2001, directed by Masoud Rashidi, broadcast in IRIB.
Night Light, 2003, directed by Majid Javanmard, broadcast in IRIB.
Brothers-in-law, 2004, directed by Farhad Ayish, broadcast in IRIB.
Momo and Momi, 2006, directed by Maryam Saadat, broadcast in IRIB.
Zero Degree Turn (Madare sefr darajeh) directed by Hassan Fathi, broadcast in IRIB.

External links

Official website
Biographi form Naqshineh Theatre

1972 births
Living people
Iranian male film actors
Iranian theatre directors
Iranian male stage actors
Iranian male television actors
21st-century Iranian male actors